Folkworks is a non-profit organisation based at The Sage Gateshead and a part of the North Music Trust.  It runs many workshops, summer schools and festivals to promote and encourage the furtherance of folk music.  It was begun in 1988 by Alistair Anderson and Ros Rigby and became part of the North Music Trust and The Sage Gateshead in 2002.  As such, Folkworks no longer continues to exist as a separate entity, as it is now a part of the North Music Trust and based in The Sage Gateshead.

Folk and Traditional Music degree 

Folkworks was instrumental in the creation of the first BMus in Folk and Traditional Music in England which began in 2001 and still plays a part in its running at the University of Newcastle upon Tyne, currently under the stewardship of acclaimed Shetland fiddler and teacher Catriona MacDonald. It was initially based in the Old Town Hall, Gateshead for three years due to the late opening of the Sage, Gateshead where it moved to in 2005. Past lecturers have included musicians Alistair Anderson, Sandra Kerr, Kathryn Tickell, Vic Gammon and Karen Tweed. Successful folk musicians who were among the first students to graduate from the degree course include Ian Stephenson, Fay Hield, Damien O'Kane, Tom Oakes, Jim Causley, Rachel McShane, Calum Stewart, Emily Portman and David Newey.

Summer Schools 

Folkworks is perhaps best known for the organisation of a series of summer schools run in Durham, usually during August. The original summer school, for musicians aged 12–25, was started in 1989 in Newcastle, and moved to Durham in 1991. Following the appointment of David Oliver as Folkworks' education director in 1993 the summer school grew in size and duration, and a second event for adults was created in 1996. The youth summer school has in previous years been held at the College of St Hild and St Bede, part of the University of Durham, and the adult summer school at a number of different venues in Durham city. As the events continued to grow, a junior summer school for musicians aged 10–13 was created in 2005. David Oliver and Alistair Anderson retired in 2009, and the youth summer school was subsequently headed by Kathryn Tickell. The current director is Ian Stephenson.

A huge range of folk musicians have been tutors at the summer schools. Regular tutors include Karen Tweed, Chris Wood and Andy Cutting, Brian Finnegan, Catriona MacDonald, Robert Harbron, Nancy Kerr and James Fagan.

Typically, a pupil at the summer schools receives two main types of teaching: instrumental tuition on his or her chosen instrument (or voice) as well as an ensemble group.  The ensemble groups present performances to their peers and a public audience at the end of the week's workshops.  Typically, a showcase concert featuring ensembles from both the youth and adult summer schools is put on at the Gala Theatre.

The youth summer school has become renowned as a meeting place for young folk musicians, and bands including 422, Kerfuffle and Last Orders have met at or attended the event. Many former students have also returned to the summer schools as tutors.

BBC Radio 2 Young Folk Award 

Until 2005, Folkworks, in partnership with production company Smooth Operations, was responsible for the organisation of the BBC Radio 2 Young Folk Award, a competition funded by the BBC and associated with Mike Harding's folk programme.  For most of its history, the semifinals of this competition were held at Kendal Youth Hostel and the Brewery Arts Centre, and the finals at the Union Chapel, Islington.  However, upon completion of The Sage Gateshead, Folkworks moved the finals there for the 2005 event.  This would prove to be the last time Folkworks ran the competition.

External links 
The Sage Gateshead
FARNE Official Folkworks Community

Music organisations based in the United Kingdom
Newcastle University
Culture in Newcastle upon Tyne
English folk music